Lik or Ngelik is a part of an Indonesian gamelan composition that contrasts from the surrounding section, either the ompak or merong.

Lik may also refer to:

People

Surname
Hon Lik or Hon Li (born 1951), Chinese pharmacist who invented the modern electronic cigarette
Peter Lik (born 1959), Australian photographer

Others
LIK, full title Literatura, Izkustvo i Kultura, Bulgarian monthly magazine 
Lik Sang, a popular distributor of Asian electronics